Amplang, also known as kerupuk kuku macan, is an Indonesian traditional savoury fish cracker snack commonly found in Indonesia and Malaysia. Amplang crackers are commonly made of ikan tenggiri (wahoo) or any type of Spanish mackerel, mixed with starch and other materials, and then fried.

The shape and size of amplang might vary, from traditional elongated "tiger nails", to dice, to ping-pong balls. The colour may range from yellow to light brown.

History

In Indonesia, amplang is traditionally associated with Samarinda, the capital city of East Kalimantan, since the amplang cracker home industry has thrived in the city since the 1970s. Traditionally amplang was made from ikan pipih or ikan belida (Chitala lopis), however since this freshwater fish has become scarce, amplang makers replaced them with ikan tenggiri (wahoo) or gabus (Striped snakehead ). From Samarinda, the popularity of this savoury fish cracker spread to other cities in the Borneo island, such as Balikpapan, Banjarmasin, Pontianak, and even to neighbouring Sabah in Malaysia.

Amplang is often sought as oleh-oleh (foodstuff gift or souvenir) by those who visited East Kalimantan. Today, amplang made by home industries in Kalimantan has been widely distributed, available in marketplaces and supermarkets in Indonesian cities, such as Jakarta, Bandung, Surabaya, and Medan.

Production centres
Amplang is commonly produced by home industries in Samarinda, East Kalimantan in Indonesia. Other than Samarinda, amplang production centres also can be found in Balikpapan, Pontianak in West Kalimantan and Banjarmasin in South Kalimantan.

In neighbouring Malaysia, amplang is mainly produced on the east coast of Sabah, particularly in the town of Tawau.

Variants
Today, the makers of amplang in East Kalimantan produce the snack not only with a fish flavor, but in a variety of flavors such as crab and seaweed. Nevertheless, the original amplang kuku macan remains the most popular.

See also

Kemplang
Krupuk udang

References 

Malaysian snack foods
Crackers (food)
Fish dishes
Indonesian snack foods